The BUT 9611T was a two-axle double deck trolleybus chassis manufactured by British United Traction between 1947 and 1951. It was  based on the AEC Regent III bus chassis, with a total of 138 manufactured for 11 operators in England at Leyland's Ham and AEC's Southall factories.

References

British United Traction
Trolleybuses
Vehicles introduced in 1947